Veronica polita, or grey field-speedwell, is a herbaceous flowering plant species in the plantain family Plantaginaceae. It has hairy stems, is either prostrate or ascending, with dull green leaves that are one of petiolate, serrate, ovate (rounded) and usually wider than long.The flowers are small and bright blue. The plant has solitary axillary peduncles that are shorter or slightly longer than the leaves. It is native to Eurasia, possibly including the British Isles, western Asia, northern Africa, and North America, but has been introduced into suitable habitats worldwide as a weed of cultivation. It is susceptible to downy mildew disease caused by the oomycete species Peronospora agrestis.

References

polita
Flora of Europe
Flora of the Canary Islands
Flora of North Africa
Flora of temperate Asia